HMS A11 was an  submarine built for the Royal Navy in the first decade of the 20th century. After surviving World War I, she was sold for scrap in 1920.

Design and description
A11 was a member of the first British class of submarines, although slightly larger, faster and more heavily armed than the lead ship, . They displaced  on the surface and  submerged. The A-class submarines had a crew of 2 officers and 9 ratings.

For surface running, the boats were powered by a single 16-cylinder  Wolseley petrol engine that drove one propeller shaft. When submerged the propeller was driven by a  electric motor. They could reach  on the surface and  underwater.

The boats were armed with two 18-inch (45 cm) torpedo tubes in the bow. They could carry a pair of reload torpedoes, but generally did not as doing so that they had to compensate for their weight by removing an equal weight of fuel.

Construction and career
A11 was ordered as part of the 1903–04 Naval Programme from Vickers. She was laid down at their shipyard in Barrow-in-Furness in 1903, launched on 8 March 1905 and completed on 11 July 1905.

On 7 September 1910 A11 collided with a barge when leaving Portsmouth Harbour. The barge was sunk, although her two crew were rescued, and A11s bow was slightly damaged. In February 1913, A11 was one of three submarines based at Lamlash on the Isle of Arran off the west coast of Scotland.

Notes

References

External links
MaritimeQuest HMS A-11 Pages

 

A-class submarines (1903)
World War I submarines of the United Kingdom
Ships built in Barrow-in-Furness
Royal Navy ship names
1905 ships
Maritime incidents in 1910